Julie Oluwatoyin Chidozie Adenuga (born 15 July 1988) is a British broadcaster, radio host and the creator of Don't Trust The Internet. She was one of the three lead DJs for Beats 1, Apple's 24/7 radio station as part of Apple Music.

Early career
Adenuga, who is of British Nigerian descent, is from the London Borough of Haringey. Adenuga is the younger sister of Jme and Skepta, who are both London-based Grime artists and record producers, as well as co-founders of the Boy Better Know record label. She also has a younger brother: Jason Adenuga, an animator.

Adenuga made her debut in the music industry in 2010, when she joined London community radio station Rinse FM and then went on to present the drive time show.

In 2014, she created and hosted a music television show on Channel AKA and Dailymotion called Play It, which serves as a platform for UK rap and grime artists as well as singers and poets.  Adenuga recently started a YouTube interview series, featuring artists such UK grime and rap artist Stormzy. As well as this, she hosted Vice Magazine's online offshoot, Noisey's, Grime Karaoke.

As part of the 2015 Apple WWDC keynote, Adenuga was introduced as the London headline host of Beats 1 radio. Beats 1 is the global radio service from Apple Music.

To add to her presenting accolades, Adenuga wrote and presented Skepta's 'Greatness Only' documentary for Noisey. Her talents have been noted and recognised with mentions in Forbes 30 under 30, NME's 500 Most Influential People in Britain and in Debrett's 500 List: Music, with a feature in Fader quoting Apple dubbing Adenuga as one of London's most vital tastemakers.

In 2020, Julie launched Don't Trust the Internet (DTTI), a creative media house that produces shows such as Julie's Top 5.

In early 2021, she began co-hosting MTV’s Catfish UK: The TV Show the UK version of the U.S. show, alongside Oobah Butler. Adenuga left the show after only one season.

References

External links
 
 
Don't Trust the Internet on YouTube

1988 births
Living people
English radio DJs
Black British DJs
English people of Nigerian descent
English people of Yoruba descent
Yoruba women musicians